Francesco Nuti (born 17 May 1955) is an Italian actor, film director and screenwriter.

Biography
Born in Prato, Nuti began his professional career as an actor in the late 1970s, when he formed the cabaret group Giancattivi together with Alessandro Benvenuti and Athina Cenci. The group took part in the TV shows Black Out and Non Stop for RAI TV, and shot their first feature film, West of Paperino (1981), written and directed by Benvenuti.

The following year Nuti abandoned the trio and began a solo career with three movies directed by Maurizio Ponzi: What a Ghostly Silence There Is Tonight (1982), The Pool Hustlers (1982) and Son contento (1983). Starting in 1985, he began to direct his movies, scoring an immediate success with the films Casablanca, Casablanca  and  All the Fault of Paradise (1985), Stregati (1987), Caruso Pascoski, Son of a Pole (1988), Willy Signori e vengo da lontano 1990 and Women in Skirts (1991). In 1988 he also participated at the Sanremo Festival with the song "Sarà per te", later recorded by Mina. In 1992 he sang with Mietta in "Lasciamoci respirare", written by singer-songwriter Biagio Antonacci.

The 1990s were however a period of decline for the Tuscan director, with poorly successful movies such as OcchioPinocchio (1994), Mr. Fifteen Balls (1998), Io amo Andrea (2000) and Caruso, Zero for Conduct (2001). In the following years Nuti also started to suffer from depression and alcoholism.

Accident and permanent disability
On 2 September 2006, just before starting to shoot a new film (which was going to be titled Olga e i fratellastri Billi), Nuti was admitted to the hospital Policlinico Umberto I in Rome, following a severe fall from the stairs of his home. The accident caused Nuti a subdural hematoma that lead to serious cerebral damage, leaving him unable to speak or move. In the following years, a few public appearances on Italian television publicly displayed his disabled condition, triggering both a powerful emotional response from Nuti's fans, and outrage for what was perceived as a ruthless exploitation of the former director's suffering. On 21 September 2016, a second fall lead to Nuti being hospitalized in critical conditions again. In July 2017, Nuti's daughter, Ginevra, becomes Nuti's legal guardian after her coming of age.

Filmography

Director
All the Fault of Paradise (1985)
Casablanca, Casablanca (1985)
Stregati (1987)
Caruso Pascoski, Son of a Pole (1988)
Willy Signori e vengo da lontano (1990)
Women in Skirts (1991)
OcchioPinocchio (1994)
Mr. Fifteen Balls (1998)
Io amo Andrea (2000)
Caruso, Zero for Conduct (2001)

Screenwriter
What a Ghostly Silence There Is Tonight (1982)
The Pool Hustlers (1982)
Son contento (1983)
Casablanca, Casablanca (1985)
All the Fault of Paradise (1985)
Stregati (1987)
Caruso Pascoski, Son of a Pole (1988)
Willy Signori e vengo da lontano (1990)
Women in Skirts (1991)
OcchioPinocchio (1994)
Mr. Fifteen Balls (1998)
Io amo Andrea (2000)
Caruso, Zero for Conduct (2001)

Actor
West of Paperino (1982)
What a Ghostly Silence There Is Tonight (1982)
The Pool Hustlers (1982)
Son contento (1983)
Sogni e bisogni (1984, TV)
Casablanca, Casablanca (1985)
All the Fault of Paradise (1985)
Stregati (1987)
Caruso Pascoski, Son of a Pole (1988)
Willy Signori e vengo da lontano (1990)
Women in Skirts (1991)
OcchioPinocchio (1994)
Mr. Fifteen Balls (1998)
Io amo Andrea (2000)
Caruso, Zero for Conduct (2001)
Concorso di colpa (2005)

Producer
Maramao (1987)
Io amo Andrea (2000)

References

External links

1955 births
Living people
People from Prato
Italian male film actors
Italian screenwriters
Italian male screenwriters
Italian film directors
David di Donatello winners
Nastro d'Argento winners
Ciak d'oro winners
20th-century Italian male actors
21st-century Italian male actors